Dobrina Liubomirova Stoylova Anguelova known as Dobrina Cristeva (Sofia, Bulgaria, October 9, 1968) is a Bulgarian-Mexican actress.  She immigrated to Mexico in 1976, when she was 8 years old. She started her career as a dancer in 1981 and as an actress in 1988.

Filmography

Film 
 Hasta que los cuernos nos separen (1995) 
 La Dedicatoria (1992) 
 Imperio de los malditos (1992) 
 Playback (1992) 
 Desvestidas y alborotadas (1991) 
 Sólo con tu pareja (1991) - Silvia Silva 
 Ciudad de ciegos (1991) - Fanny 
 Alma negra, magia blanca (1991)

Television 
 Como dice el dicho (2015) - Liliana
 La rosa de Guadalupe (2010-2019)  
 Dejate Llevar - Greta (2010)
 Siempre Hay Un Motivo - Magda (2012)
 La Música Del Amor - Elizabeth (2013)
 Lo Que Es El Amor - Luisa (2014)
 Ladrona De Corazones - Virginia (2014)
 Contrato De Amor - Gabriela (2015)
 Bocanada De Amor - Leonor (2015)
 Camino Al Amor - Catalina (2017)
 Casa De Dos - Irma (2017)
 La Foto - Alfonsina (2018)
 Pasión Del Verdadero Amor - Eloísa (2018)
 El Jardín De Los Gnomos - Candelaria (2019)
 Muchacha italiana viene a casarse (2014 telenovela) 2014 - Belinda
 Teresa (2010) - Mayra
 Atrévete a soñar (2009) - Aura 
 En nombre del amor (2008/2009 - Elisa 
 Vecinos (2008) - Receptionist 
 Tormenta en el Paraiso (2007) - Cleotilde 
 Mujer, casos de la vida real (2006]) - Various episodes
 Rebelde (2004/2006) - Yolanda 'Yuli' Huber
 De pocas, pocas pulgas (2003) - Marisa
 Clase 406 (2002/2003) - Natalia Brech 
 Lo que callamos las mujeres (2001) - Vivian
 Valentina (1993) - Débora
 Luces de la noche (1998) - Tina (Jovem) 
 Los Vuelcos del corazón (1996)

References

1968 births
Living people
Actresses from Sofia
Bulgarian emigrants to Mexico
Mexican film actresses
Mexican telenovela actresses
Naturalized citizens of Mexico
Mexican people of Bulgarian descent